This list of tallest buildings in Wellington ranks the tallest building's in the New Zealand capital city of Wellington by height. This ranking system, created by the US-based Council on Tall Buildings and Urban Habitat includes the height to a spire but not to an antenna.

Tallest buildings
All are High-rises except for the 1st, 2nd and 3rd ranked buildings which are Skyscrapers.

Under construction, approved or proposed

Demolished

Cancelled

History of the Tallest buildings in Wellington

See also
List of tallest buildings in Auckland
List of tallest buildings in Christchurch
List of tallest buildings in Oceania

References

External links

 Emporis.com Wellington High-rise Buildings

Buildings and structures in Wellington City
Lists of tallest buildings in Oceania